The 2015–16 Fairleigh Dickinson Knights men's basketball team represented Fairleigh Dickinson University during the 2015–16 NCAA Division I men's basketball season. The team was led by third-year head coach Greg Herenda. The Knights played their home games at the Rothman Center and were members of the Northeast Conference. They finished the season 18–15, 11–7 in NEC play to finish in a three-way tie for second place. They defeated Saint Francis (PA), Mount St. Mary's, and Wagner to win the NEC tournament and receive the conference's automatic bid to the NCAA tournament. As a No. 16 seed, they lost to Florida Gulf Coast in the First Four.

Roster

Schedule

|-
!colspan=9 style="background:#800020; color:#FFFFFF;"| Non-conference regular season

|-
!colspan=9 style="background:#800020; color:#FFFFFF;"| Northeast Conference regular season

|-
!colspan=9 style="background:#800020; color:#FFFFFF;"| NEC tournament

|-
!colspan=9 style="background:#800020; color:#FFFFFF;"|NCAA tournament

References

Fairleigh Dickinson Knights men's basketball seasons
Fairleigh Dickinson
Fairleigh Dickinson
Fairleigh Dickinson
Fairleigh Dickinson